Kheyt (also Romanized as Kheyţ) is a village in Mosharrahat Rural District, in the Central District of Ahvaz County, Khuzestan Province, Iran. At the 2006 census, its population was 281, in 55 families.

References 

Populated places in Ahvaz County